Premiership (the state of being a premier) may refer to:

 The post of premier or prime minister, who is the head of government in many parliamentary systems
 Premier League, the highest-level football league competition in England (previously branded officially as the Premiership between 1993 and 2007)
 Scottish Premiership, the highest level football league competition in Scotland
 The Principality Premiership, the highest-level domestic rugby union competition (but secondary to the multinational Pro14) in Wales
 Cymru Premier, the highest level football league competition in Wales
 NIFL Premiership, the highest-level football league competition in Northern Ireland
 Premiership Rugby, known for sponsorship reasons as the Gallagher Premiership, the highest-level rugby union competition in England. "Premiership Rugby" is also the name of the company that operates the league.
 NRL Premiership, the highest level rugby league competition in Australasia
 Scottish Premiership (rugby union), the top amateur-level rugby union competition in Scotland (but below the multinational Pro14 and the semi-professional Super 6)
 The Rugby League Premiership, a title that was available to English rugby league clubs from 1974 to 1997
Premier Soccer Saturday, RTÉ
 The Mitre 10 Premiership, the top-tier competition within the Mitre 10 Cup in New Zealand rugby union
The Premiership, ITV's flagship football programme from 2001 to 2004
 In the A-League of Australian soccer, the "premiership" is won by the team finishing first on the league table after the regular season
 the title given to the Australian rules football team that won the title during a particular year via the AFL Grand Final

See also
 Minor premiership, the standard Australian term for what the A-League calls the "premiership"